Uli Egen (born 24 August 1956) is a German ice hockey player. He competed in the men's tournament at the 1980 Winter Olympics.

References

External links
 

1956 births
Living people
German ice hockey players
Olympic ice hockey players of West Germany
Ice hockey players at the 1980 Winter Olympics
Sportspeople from Füssen